Kristjan Saavo (1878 Luunja Parish, Kreis Dorpat – ?) was an Estonian politician. He was a member of II Riigikogu. He was a member of the Riigikogu since 17 May 1924. He replaced Hugo Kaas.

References

1878 births
Year of death missing
People from Luunja Parish
People from Kreis Dorpat
Workers' United Front politicians
Estonian Independent Socialist Workers' Party politicians
Estonian Socialist Workers' Party politicians
Members of the Riigikogu, 1923–1926